Capital punishment in Australia was a form of punishment in Australia that has been abolished in all jurisdictions. Queensland abolished the death penalty in 1922. Tasmania did the same in 1968. The Commonwealth abolished the death penalty in 1973, with application also in the Australian Capital Territory and the Northern Territory. Victoria did so in 1975, South Australia in 1976, and Western Australia in 1984. New South Wales abolished the death penalty for murder in 1955, and for all crimes in 1985. In 2010, the Commonwealth Parliament passed legislation prohibiting the re-establishment of capital punishment by any state or territory. Australian law prohibits the extradition or deportation of a prisoner to another jurisdiction if they could be sentenced to death for any crime.

The last execution in Australia took place in 1967, when Ronald Ryan was hanged in Victoria. Between Ryan's execution in 1967 and 1984, several more people were sentenced to death, but had their sentences commuted to life imprisonment. The last death sentence was given in August 1984, when Brenda Hodge was sentenced to death in Western Australia (and subsequently had her sentence commuted to life imprisonment).

History

Before the arrival of Europeans, death sentences were carried out under Aboriginal customary law, either directly or through sorcery. In some cases the condemned could be denied mortuary rites. The first executions carried out under European law in Australia took place in Western Australia in 1629, when Dutch authorities hanged the mutineers of the Batavia.

Capital punishment had been part of the legal system of Australia since British settlement. During the 19th century, crimes that could carry a death sentence included burglary, sheep stealing, forgery, sexual assaults, murder and manslaughter, and there is one reported case of someone being executed for "being illegally at large". During the 19th century, these crimes saw about 80 people hanged each year throughout Australia.

Before Federation, each colony made its own criminal laws and punishments. Since then the States have been responsible for most criminal law. Since Federation in 1901, 114 people have been legally executed in Australia. For lists of people executed in Australia, sorted by state or territory, see the sidebar.

Commonwealth
In 1973 the Death Penalty Abolition Act 1973 of the Commonwealth abolished the death penalty for federal offences. It provided in Section 3 that the Act applied to any offence against a law of the Commonwealth, the Territories or under an Imperial Act, and in s. 4 that "[a] person is not liable to the punishment of death for any offence".

No executions were ever carried out under Commonwealth criminal laws, and the passage of the Death Penalty Abolition Act 1973 saw the death penalty replaced with life imprisonment as the maximum punishment. On 11 March 2010, Federal Parliament passed laws that prevent the death penalty from being reintroduced by any state or territory in Australia.

The Commonwealth will not extradite or deport a prisoner to another jurisdiction if they could be sentenced to death for any crime. A recent case involving this was the case of American Gabe Watson, who was convicted of the manslaughter of his wife in North Queensland, and faced capital murder charges in his home state of Alabama. His deportation was delayed until the government received assurances that he would not be executed if found guilty.

Australian Capital Territory
No executions were carried out in the Australian Capital Territory, where federal legislation abolished capital punishment in 1973.

New South Wales

The last execution in New South Wales was carried out on 24 August 1939, when John Trevor Kelly was hanged at Sydney's Long Bay Correctional Centre for the murder of Marjorie Constance Sommarlad. New South Wales abolished the death penalty for murder in 1955, but retained it as a potential penalty for treason, piracy, and arson in naval dockyards until 1985. New South Wales was the last Australian state to formally abolish the death penalty for all crimes.

Norfolk Island

Between 1800 and 1846, over 30 people were executed on Norfolk Island, which was a penal colony at the time. On one day in 1846, William Westwood and 11 other convicts were hanged for their involvement in the Cooking Pot Uprising.

Northern Territory

There were nine executions between 1893 and 1952. Seven of them took place at Fannie Bay Gaol, the other two at regional locations close to where the crime took place.

The last execution in the Northern Territory was a double hanging at Fannie Bay Gaol on 8 August 1952. The death penalty was abolished in 1973.

Queensland

A total of 94 people were hanged in the Moreton Bay/Queensland region from 1830 until 1913. The last person hanged was Ernest Austin on 22 September 1913 for the rape and murder of 11-year-old Ivy Mitchell.

The only woman to be hanged was Ellen Thompson on 13 June 1887; she was hanged alongside her lover, John Harrison, for murdering her husband William.

In 1922, Queensland became the first part of the British Commonwealth to abolish the death penalty.

South Australia

The Adelaide Gaol was the site of forty-four hangings, from Joseph Stagg on 18 November 1840 to Glen Sabre Valance, murderer and rapist, on 24 November 1964. Three executions also occurred at Mount Gambier Gaol, five at country locations out of Port Lincoln, three at Franklin Harbor, one at Streaky Bay and two at Fowler's Bay.

Two Ngarrindjeri men were controversially executed by hanging along the Coorong on 22 August 1840, after a drumhead court-martial conducted by Police Commissioner O'Halloran on the orders of Governor George Gawler. The men were found to be guilty of murdering the twenty-five survivors of the shipwreck Maria a few months before.

Elizabeth Woolcock, the only woman ever to have been executed under South Australian law, was hanged on 30 December 1873. Her body was not released to the family and was buried between the inner and outer walls of the prison, identified by a number and the date of the execution.

In the late 1950s, Don Dunstan became well known for his campaign against the death penalty being imposed on Max Stuart, who was convicted of rape and murder of a young girl, opposing then-Premier Thomas Playford IV over the matter.

In 1976, under the premiership of then-Premier Dunstan, the Criminal Law Consolidation Act 1935 (SA) was modified so that the death sentence was changed to life imprisonment.

Tasmania

In the early days of colonial rule, Tasmania, then known as Van Diemen's Land, was the site of penal transports. Mary McLauchlan was convicted in 1830 for infanticide; she was sentenced to both death and dissection. She was the first woman to be hanged in Tasmania.

The last execution was on 14 February 1946, when serial rapist and killer Frederick Thompson was hanged for the murder of eight-year-old Evelyn Maughan. The death penalty was abolished in 1968.

Victoria

Victoria's first executions occurred in 1842 when two Aboriginal men, Tunnerminnerwait and Maulboyheenner, were hanged outside the site of the Melbourne Gaol for the killing of two whalers in the Westernport district. Ronald Ryan was the last man executed at Pentridge Prison and in Australia. He was hanged on 3 February 1967 after being convicted of shooting dead a prison officer during an escape from Pentridge Prison, Coburg, Victoria in 1965.

Victoria was also the state of the last woman executed in Australia: Jean Lee was hanged in 1951. She was accused of being an accomplice in the murder of 73-year-old William ('Pop') Kent. She, along with her accomplices, were executed on 19 February 1951. Victoria would not carry out another execution until that of Ronald Ryan.

Not all those executed were murderers: for instance, Albert McNamara was hanged for arson causing death in 1902, and David Bennett was hanged in 1932 after being convicted of raping a four-year-old girl. Bennett was the last man to be hanged in Australia for an offence other than murder.

This number includes triple murderer Edward Leonski, executed by the U.S. Army in 1942.

The beam and trapdoor used to execute condemned prisoners were removed from Old Melbourne Gaol and installed in D Division at Pentridge Prison by the condemned child rapist David Bennett, who was a carpenter by trade. It was used for all 10 Pentridge hangings (including a double hanging). After Victoria abolished capital punishment in 1975, the beam and trapdoor were removed and put into storage. The beam was reinstalled at the Old Melbourne Gaol in August 2000, although the trapdoor had been modified during installation at Pentridge and no longer fitted.

Western Australia

In Western Australia, the first legal executions were under Dutch VOC law on 2 October 1629 on Long Island, Houtman Abrolhos (near Geraldton), when Jeronimus Corneliszoon and six others were hanged as party to the murders of 125 men, women and children.

Following British colonization, between 1833 and 1855 executions by firing squad and hanging were performed at a variety of places, often at the site of the offence. Even with the construction of the new Perth Gaol in 1855 as the main execution site in the state, some executions were carried out at various country locations until 1900. In 1886 the Fremantle Prison was handed over to the colonial government as the colony's major prison; from 1889 43 men and one woman (Martha Rendell) were hanged there.

The first execution under British law was that of Midgegooroo, who on 22 May 1833 was executed by firing squad while bound to the door of the original Perth Gaol. John Gavin, a Parkhurst apprentice, was the first British settler to be executed in Western Australia. In 1844 he was hanged for murder at the Fremantle Round House, at the age of fifteen. Bridget Larkin was the first woman to be executed in Western Australia, for the murder of John Hurford, in 1855.
“It is the sentence of this court that you be returned to your former custody, and at a time and place appointed by the Governor-in-Council, that you be hanged by the neck till you are dead, and may the Lord have mercy on your soul”.
The last execution was that of Eric Edgar Cooke on 26 October 1964 at Fremantle Prison. Cooke had been convicted on one count of murder, but evidence and his confessions suggested he had committed many more. The last sentence of death in Western Australia was passed in 1984, but the female killer (Brenda Hodge) in question had her sentence commuted to imprisonment for life, as was customary by this stage.

Capital punishment was formally removed from the statutes of the state with the passage of the Acts Amendment (Abolition of Capital Punishment) Act 1984.

Public opinion
In Australia capital punishment was banned on a state-by-state basis through the 20th century. Despite the ban, polls have indicated varying support for the reintroduction of the practice. After the (wrongful) conviction of Lindy Chamberlain for murdering her baby Azaria there was a surge in demands that she be hanged. The overturning of her conviction caused a short-lived drop in support for the death penalty. A 2005 Bulletin poll showed that most Australians supported capital punishment. The Australian National University's 2007 Electoral Survey found that 44 per cent of people thought the death penalty should be reintroduced, while only 38 per cent disagreed. In the recent case of the Bali bombers, then prime minister John Howard stated that Australians expected their execution by Indonesia.

On occasion the issue of capital punishment is published in the media or is subject to media and public support and scrutiny. Most occasions where capital punishment is brought up in the media, it is regarding current cases of intense media coverage regarding murder, rape and in extreme circumstances such as terrorism. On various occasions, the media and public express support for capital punishment for the most heinous of crimes including mass murder such as in the cases of the Milat Backpacker Murders and the Bryant Port Arthur massacre, in which a total of 42 people were killed stirring strong emotions as to whether or not to reintroduce the death penalty. However, no person of significant stature or influence has advocated the death penalty for quite some time since the last execution in 1967. The death penalty was completely abolished in Australia with the Crimes Legislation Amendment (Torture Prohibition and Death Penalty Abolition) Bill 2009 passing the Australian Senate without amendments in March 2010.

In 2009 a public opinion survey was conducted by Roy Morgan Research where responders were given the question: "In your opinion, should the penalty for murder be death or imprisonment?" The surveyors conducted the poll for people from 14 and onwards in age with around 687 people completing the survey for publication. The results of the poll are as follows:

In 2014 another public opinion survey was conducted by Roy Morgan Research where responders were given the question: "If a person is convicted of a terrorist act in Australia which kills someone should the penalty be death?” The surveyors conducted the poll with a cross-section of 1,307 Australians. The poll showed a small majority of Australians (52.5%) favoured the death penalty for deadly terrorist acts in Australia while 47.5% did not.

See also
 Punishment in Australia

References

Other sources
 Death Penalty Abolition Act 1973
Capital Punishment from the Fremantle Prison site
Trends & Issues in Crime and Criminal Justice No. 3: Capital punishment  from the Australian Institute of Criminology
Dhakiyarr Wirrpanda – Appeal for Justice
"Capital Punishment" speech by The Ian Callinan, Justice of the High Court of Australia
The History of Correctional Services in South Australia

External links

Further reading 
 Purdue, Brian Legal Executions in Western Australia, Foundation Press, Victoria Park, WA, 1993. 
 Heaton, J.H. Australian Dictionary of Dates and Men of the Time, S.W. Silver & Son, London, 1879. Part 2, pages 90–94.

Australia
Law enforcement in Australia
Death in Australia
1967 disestablishments in Australia
Human rights in Australia
Legal history of Australia
1984 disestablishments in Australia
1629 establishments in Australia